Spring Creek is an unincorporated community in Perry County, Tennessee, United States. It is just east of Mousetail Landing State Park.

References

Unincorporated communities in Perry County, Tennessee
Unincorporated communities in Tennessee